Chamaesphecia gorbunovi is a moth of the family Sesiidae. It is found in Greece, Turkey, Azerbaijan and Armenia.

The larvae feed on Scutellaria species.

References

Moths described in 1992
Sesiidae
Moths of Europe
Moths of Asia